"Footloose" is a song co-written and recorded by American singer-songwriter Kenny Loggins. It was released in January 1984 as the first of two singles by Loggins from the 1984 film of the same name (the other one being "I'm Free (Heaven Helps the Man)"). The song spent three weeks at number one, March 31—April 14, 1984, on the US Billboard Hot 100, becoming Loggins' only chart-topper, and was the first of two number-one hits from the film. Billboard ranked it at the No. 4 song for 1984.

The song was very well received, and is one of the most recognizable song recorded by Loggins. When the American Film Institute released its AFI's 100 Years...100 Songs, "Footloose" reached the 96th position. The song was covered by country music artist Blake Shelton for the 2011 remake of the 1984 film.

It was nominated for an Academy Award for Best Original Song at the 1985 ceremony, losing to Stevie Wonder's "I Just Called to Say I Love You" from The Woman in Red.

The single version is slightly shorter in length compared to the album version.  It begins with a soloed guitar track instead of a drum intro, and features more prominent backing vocals in the mix, particularly towards the end of the song.

In 2018, it was selected for preservation in the National Recording Registry by the Library of Congress as being "culturally, historically, or artistically significant."

Music video
The music video for "Footloose" was directed by Brian Grant. It uses the single version and features several scenes from the film, in particular the warehouse where Kevin Bacon's character performs an unorchestrated dance routine (which was actually performed to a different song in the film itself).

Personnel
 Kenny Loggins – lead vocals
 Neil Larsen – keyboards
 Steve Wood – keyboards, background vocals
 Buzz Feiten – guitar
 Nathan East – bass guitar 
 Michael Boddicker – synth bass, percussion
 Tris Imboden – drums
 Paulinho da Costa – percussion
 Marilyn Dorman and Rick Washington – background vocalists

Charts

Weekly charts

Year-end charts

All-time charts

Certifications

Blake Shelton version

Blake Shelton covered the song for the 2011 remake of the film. Shelton's version also appears on the film's soundtrack. It charted at number 63 on the US Billboard Hot Country Songs chart in November 2011. A music video for Shelton's version of the song, directed by Shaun Silva, premiered in October 2011.

Music video
The video opens with Blake Shelton driving a pickup truck into a drive-in theater screening the 2011 remake of the 1984 movie wherein the manager and ticket seller tells him that the film was only about to start. He then enters the compound where his band awaits him while the theater patrons watch the film and take notice of him. Shelton and his band begin to perform the song and the theater patrons join in dancing while scenes from the film are played. The music video was filmed in early 2011 at the Hi-Way 50 Drive In theater located in Lewisburg, Tennessee.

Personnel
Blake Shelton – vocals

Chart performance

Certifications

Other cover versions
VeggieTales performed this song in Bob and Larry Sing the 80's.

The final episode of the season 2 episode of Regular Show titled "Karaoke Video", where Pops (voiced by Sam Marin) sings his version of the song towards the end.

Chord Overstreet and Kevin McHale performed this song in Glee, season 4.

Andrew Goodwin and David Johnson sang a cover of this song for Final Space, season 2, episode 4, "The Other Side".

The song is featured on the dance-based music game Just Dance Kids 2014 and covered by The Just Dance Kids. It is also featured on Just Dance 2018 as a cover by Top Culture.

See also
List of Billboard Hot 100 number-one singles of 1984

References

External links
 Kenny Loggins discusses "Footloose" - RetroRewind interview

1984 singles
2011 singles
Kenny Loggins songs
Blake Shelton songs
Billboard Hot 100 number-one singles
Cashbox number-one singles
Music videos directed by Shaun Silva
Number-one singles in Australia
Number-one singles in New Zealand
Oricon International Singles Chart number-one singles
RPM Top Singles number-one singles
Number-one singles in South Africa
Songs about dancing
Songs from Footloose
Songs written by Kenny Loggins
Songs written by Dean Pitchford
Columbia Records singles
Atlantic Records singles
1983 songs
1980s ballads
United States National Recording Registry recordings